General elections were held in Brazil on October 3, 1994, the second to take place under the provisions of the 1988 constitution and the second direct presidential election since 1960.

Elected in 1989, President Fernando Collor of the centre-right National Reconstruction Party (PRN) had resigned in the face of an impeachment trial, resulting in Vice President Itamar Franco succeeding him. Facing a fiscal crisis Franco's government launched the Plano Real ("Real Plan") to stabilize the national economy. The architect of the policy, Minister of Finance Fernando Henrique Cardoso, was chosen by the PSDB to serve as their presidential candidate in Franco's absence. For the position of Vice President, Cardoso selected former presidential Chief of Staff Marco Maciel of the Liberal Front Party (PFL).

Luiz Inácio Lula da Silva, a former labor leader and federal deputy for São Paulo who had narrowly lost the 1989 presidential election, resigned as president of the Workers' Party (PT) to mount a second presidential candidacy. Lula intended to make José Paulo Bisol of the Brazilian Socialist Party (PSB) his running mate as he had in 1989. Bisol was replaced by Lula ally and fellow PT member Aloizio Mercadante on the ticket. In the spring of 1994, Lula appeared an overwhelming favorite over Cardoso, leading with 40% to Cardoso's 12% in an April poll, and by a 41% to 17% margin as of May. The Real Plan proved popular among Lula's own voters, with 70% of Lula supporters indicating their support for the Franco Administration's signature policy, and Lula was damaged by his opposition to the program.

On election day, Cardoso won by a wide margin and absolute majority, negating the need for a second round. Cardoso notably won every state in the northeast, a region which would later emerge as the PT's political base. The relative success of far-right candidate Enéas Carneiro, a cardiologist who had never won office before and ran as a member of the Party of the Reconstruction of the National Order (PRONA), was also noted; Carneiro won over 7% of the vote, placing him ahead of many established politicians. Carneiro's vote share was the highest received by a far-right presidential candidate until Jair Bolsonaro's victory in 2018.

Background
In 1989, Brazil held its first direct presidential election since 1960 following the end of the military dictatorship in Brazil. Fernando Collor, a young, charismatic leader who had previous served as Governor of Alagoas, won a hotly contested election versus Luiz Inácio Lula da Silva after positioning himself as a political outsider. Just over two years into his presidency, Collor was faced with allegations of corruption by his brother Pedro Collor, and chose to resign in late 1992 in the face of an impeachment trial.

Following his resignation, Vice President Itamar Franco succeeded him in the office. Once in office, Franco switched from the National Reconstruction Party (PRN) to the Brazilian Democratic Movement Party (PMDB). Facing a hyperinflation crisis and popular discontent, Franco's government pushed a fiscal policy known as the Plano Real (Real Plan) to stabilize the economy. Minister of Finance Fernando Henrique Cardoso, an experienced politician who had previously served as Senator from São Paulo and as Franco's Minister of Foreign Affairs, served as the architect of the plan.

Franco was barred from running for a full term in 1994. In Brazil, whenever a vice president serves part of a president's term, even when the president travels abroad, it counts as a full term. At the time, the Constitution did not allow a president to run for immediate reelection. In the absence of Franco, Cardoso would be chosen by the PSDB (a party born from inside the PMDB) as their nominee for President of Brazil in the 1994 election.

Lula's running mate controversy
As he had in 1989, Lula intended for Senator José Paulo Bisol of Rio Grande do Sul, a member of the Brazilian Socialist Party (PSB), to serve as his vice presidential running mate. A former judge, Bisol had a strong reputation as an opponent of corruption, playing a key role in the investigation that ultimately led to President Fernando Collor de Mello's resignation. Additionally, his membership of a party that played a crucial role in the centre-left coalition made his selection attractive to Lula. Bisol's image as a "Mr. Clean" was harmed during campaign season by revelations of wrongdoing as a judge in 1981.

The saga proved damaging to Lula's campaign, and as a result the leadership of the PT looked for a replacement for Bisol on the ticket. Arguing that Bisol should be replaced on the ticket by a fellow member of the PSB, PSB president Miguel Arraes pushed for the selection of Célio de Castro, then serving as Vice Mayor of Belo Horizonte, to replace Bisol as Lula's running mate. Key power-players in the PT, such as party president Rui Falcão, successfully convinced Lula to replace Bisol with Aloízio Mercadante. A co-founder of the PT, Mercadante was then serving as a federal deputy for São Paulo. Mercadante's background as a career economist during a hyperinflation crisis was seen as a plus for PT party leadership.

Campaign of Enéas Carneiro
In the 1989 presidential election, the right-wing nationalist campaign of Enéas Carneiro received attention for Carneiro's exotic image. A short, bald man with a long beard and distinct "coke-bottle" glasses, Carneiro's unusual appearance and signature catchphrase Meu nome é Enéas ("My name is Enéas") gained the cardiologist a following. Nonetheless, Carneiro, who ran as a member of the Party of the Reconstruction of the National Order (PRONA), came 12th in a field of 21 candidates.

In 1994, Carneiro mounted a second bid for the presidency. The entrance of federal deputy Regina Gordilho of Rio de Janeiro, who had been elected as a member of the centre-left Democratic Labour Party, allowed his campaign to receive more guaranteed election time. For the position of Vice President, Carneiro chose Rear Admiral Roberto Gama e Silva to serve as his running mate.

Considered a nationalist and accused by opponents of being a member of the far-right, Carneiro's unexpected third-place finish with over 7% of the national vote was considered a shocking result. Carneiro, who had never been elected to office, received a larger share of the vote than longtime staple of the Brazilian Left Leonel Brizola, who had been a top candidate for the presidency four years prior.

Candidates

Candidacies denied

Results

President

Chamber of Deputies

Senate

Notes

References

General elections in Brazil
Brazil
General
October 1994 events in South America
Election and referendum articles with incomplete results